Ya! Ya! is an album by saxophonist Budd Johnson which was recorded in early 1964 and released on the Argo label.

Track listing
All compositions by Budd Johnson except where noted.
 "Ya! Ya!" – 5:19
 "Come Rain or Come Shine" (Harold Arlen, Johnny Mercer) – 4:09
 "Big Al" – 2:00
 "Exotique" (Esmond Edwards) – 4:08
 "The Revolution" – 3:46
 "Tag Along with Me" – 2:38
 "Chloe" (Neil Moret, Gus Kahn) – 3:46
 "When Hearts Are Young" (Sigmund Romberg, Al Goodman, Cyrus Wood) – 4:10
 "Where It's At" (E. Herbert) – 3:54

Personnel
Budd Johnson – tenor saxophone
Al Williams – organ
Richard Davis (tracks 3-5, 8 & 9), George Duvivier (tracks 1, 2, 6 & 7)  – bass
Belton Evans – drums

References

Budd Johnson albums
1964 albums
Argo Records albums
Albums produced by Esmond Edwards